The U.S. 60th Infantry Regiment is a regimental unit in the United States Army. Its 2nd and 3rd Battalion conduct Basic Combat Training.

Participating in three wars on three continents, the 60th has played a conspicuous role in the achievements of 5th Division in World War I and 9th Infantry Division in World War II and Vietnam. The regimental crest reflects this. The cannon in the embattled canton refers to the 7th Infantry Regiment that provided the cadre who activated the regiment; it is a principal charge in the 7th's arms. The silver pale wavy makes reference to the Regiment's crossing of the Meuse in World War I; and the red diamond on that pale wavy to the Fifth Infantry Division, to which the 60th was assigned in the First World War.

World War I 

The 60th Infantry was organized in June 1917, two months after the American entry into World War I, from cadre furnished by the 7th Infantry Regiment. In November it was assigned to the 5th Division and underwent its baptism of fire on the Western Front the following year. The regiment participated in the campaigns of St. Mihiel, Alsace and Lorraine and finally in the Meuse–Argonne offensive. During this battle, First Lieutenant Samuel Woodfill, later called by General John "Blackjack" Pershing, Commander-in-Chief (C-in-C) of the American Expeditionary Forces (AEF) on the Western Front, "the outstanding doughboy of the war", was awarded the Medal of Honor for leading his men in the destruction of enemy positions in the Bois de la Pultiere near Cunel, Meuse, France. Lt. Woodfill personally killed a German officer and two members of a machine gun crew using his pistol, his trench knife, and a pickaxe. He and his men also captured a number of enemy soldiers and their weapons.

World War II 

After the First World War the 60th Infantry was inactivated at Camp Jackson, South Carolina, on 2 September 1921. A generation later, in August 1940, war in Europe resulted in a rapid expansion of the U.S. Army. The 60th Infantry was reactivated and assigned to the 9th Infantry Division on 10 August 1940.

The 60th Infantry spearheaded the November 1942, Allied invasion of French Morocco at Port Lyautey during Operation Torch, crediting each member of the unit that made the amphibious assault landing the arrowhead device. The landing under fire laid the basis for its nickname 'Scouts Out'. At the time of the invasion, there was great confusion among the Navy coxswains about the landing sites. They either placed the infantry units in the wrong sector, or put them on the beaches very late. The 60th Infantry, for example, landed at 05:30, 40 minutes late, giving the defending Vichy French time to organize. The 60th Infantry's 1st Battalion landed 2,800 yards north of their assigned beach, and were engaged by French light tanks once ashore. Its 2nd and 3rd Battalions were strafed by French planes. Company E, 2nd Battalion, was stopped completely at a strongpoint, the Port Lyautey lighthouse. The 2nd Battalion's eventual objective was to take an ancient fortress called the Kasba. Once the landing points were completely secured, engagements were fought between small units and opposing batteries. The 60th Infantry culminated its successful North African campaigns with a defense on 18 April 1943 (Easter Sunday) against a massive German attack.

The 2nd Battalion, 60th Infantry earned the regiment's and the 9th Division's, first Presidential Unit Citation for its actions on 23 and 24 April during the Battle of Sedjenane. The Germans hit the 2nd Battalion from all four sides with two infantry battalions supported by artillery. After a four-hour attack that failed, the Germans left 116 dead, 48 wounded, and many prisoners in American hands. During the 60th Infantry's drive along the Tunisia-Algeria border, the regiment captured a German general's diary which gave the regiment its nickname, the "Go Devils". In his account of American actions against the Germans, the general wrote, "Look at those devils go!" The 60th Infantry thereafter became known as the "Go Devils". During the battle Sergeant William L. Nelson was posthumously awarded the Medal of Honor.

During the Allied invasion of Sicily, the 60th Infantry continued its victorious ways, culminating in the famous Silent March ("Ghost March"), where the regiment infiltrated enemy lines and broke open the last of the German resistance. On 5 August 1943, the 60th Infantry landed at Palermo, Sicily. Their first combat action there was the first of the infiltrations they would make in Sicily. The 60th Infantry flanked the city of Troina, which forced the German artillery protecting their infantrymen in the city to withdraw, allowing other U.S. divisions to easily swallow up the Germans in the city. Next, the 60th Infantry chased the retreating Germans east towards Randazzo. The pursuit was hindered by a number booby traps, demolitions, anti-tank and personnel mines, craters and blown bridges. Regardless, the 60th Infantry completed its flanking movement around Randazzo, which allowed the 39th Infantry Regiment, 9th Infantry Division, to take Randazzo and open the road to Messina which was taken on 17 August. Rest and further training followed for some two months. On 11 November 1943, the 60th Infantry embarked for Winchester, Hampshire, England.

On 11 June 1944, the 60th Infantry debarked at Utah Beach on the Cotentin Peninsula, Normandy, France. On 12 June, driving hard toward the St. Colombe in France, the 2nd Battalion, 60th Infantry completely outdistanced the rest of the 9th Division. For a time, the 60th Regiment was believed to be lost. Actually, its 2nd Battalion had overrun the German defenses in the face of murderous fire and had cut the main highway to the northwest. Instead of withdrawing, the battalion set up a bridgehead on the Douve River and held the position for seven hours until the rest of the 9th Division caught up to them, thus facilitating the cutting of the peninsula. Due to this demonstration of rapid penetration and maneuver, the "Scouts Out" motto originated for the 2nd Battalion. "Scouts Out" is the official greeting of the 2nd Battalion, 60th Infantry.

In France during June 1944, the 60th Infantry once again led the way for the 9th Division as it spearheaded the American advance out of the beachhead that cut the Contentin Peninsula. While the 39th and 47th Infantry Regiments of the 9th Division secured the vital Port of Cherburg, the 60th Infantry cleared Cape La Hague, northwest of Cherbourg, where Medal of Honor recipient Second Lieutenant John E. Butts was killed. At the pivotal crossing of the Douve River, Lieutenant Butts earned the Medal of Honor and the 2nd Battalion earned its second Presidential Unit Citation. Following the breakout at St. Lo, the 60th Infantry rushed south during Operation Cobra and helped relieve the battered 30th Infantry Division, that had been surrounded by the Germans in their own counterattack (Operation Luttich). Next, the 60th Infantry turned east and helped in the closure and clearing of the Falaise pocket. Continuing east, the 60th Infantry crossed the Marne, Aisne, and the Seine Rivers in a matter of days. Next the 60th Infantry entered Belgium and made its second combat crossing of the Meuse River. In this action, Medal of Honor recipient, Lieutenant Colonel Matt Urban was wounded for the seventh time after having gone AWOL from a hospital to rejoin the 2nd Battalion and lead them in combat.

After the bitter and bloody struggle in the Huertegen Forest, the 60th Infantry fell back to the Monschau area where its efforts won it a third Presidential Unit Citation in the snow and bitter cold of the Battle of the Bulge. The 60th Infantry then was the first to capture the Schwammanuel Dam on the Roer River. Continuing south, the regiment was one of the first to cross the Rhine at Remagen. After expanding the bridgehead, the regiment shot northeast, where they helped seal and destroy the Ruhr Pocket. Continuing northeast, the 60th Infantry advanced toward the Harz Mountains, where for the first time the regiment had attached to them a platoon of black volunteers. While destroying a German roadblock, one of the volunteers, Private First Class Jack Thomas, won the Distinguished Service Cross for extraordinary heroism. After relieving the 3rd Armored Division, the 60th Infantry held that line until VE day, and met up with Russian soldiers soon after. For their actions in Central Europe, the regiment was awarded a fourth Presidential Unit Citation. The 60th Infantry was inactivated in November 1946 while on occupation duty in Germany.

Vietnam War 

After service as the 2nd Battle Group, 60th Infantry from 1958 to 1962, three battalions (2/60, 3/60, and 5/60 Mechanized) were activated at Fort Riley, Kansas, and assigned to the 9th Infantry Division for its deployment to the Republic of Vietnam in December 1966. The 9th Division was the only major U.S. combat unit to conduct operations in the Mekong Delta. On 13 September 1968, the 5th/60th Mech was "swapped" with the 1st/16th of the 1st Infantry Division. From then until August 1970, the 5th/60th operated as a "straight leg" infantry unit. The battalions of the 60th Infantry participated in both Riverine operations and "jitterbug tactics" which featured split-second timing of airmobile insertions in close proximity to enemy units. These operations enabled the battalions to be awarded unit citations and campaign streamers, including one Presidential Unit Citation. Beginning with the 3rd Brigade in July 1969, the 9th Infantry Division was the first US Division to be withdrawn from Vietnam.  [Although 'Old Reliables' were returning to the United States, from the Summer of 1969 on into the Fall of 1970, units of the 3rd Brigade remained in the Mekong Delta; operating under the command of the 25th Infantry Division in Cu Chi] The Division returned to Ft. Lewis, Washington, in 1970 where its battalions were inactivated.

During the 1960s and 1970s the 1st Battalion, 60th Infantry was active as an element of the 172d Infantry Brigade in Alaska and did not deploy to Vietnam. The unit existed into the early 1980s when it was reflagged as a battalion of the 327th Infantry, as were the other two battalions of the brigade, forming the 4th, 5th and 6th Battalions, 327th Infantry. These were aligned with the 1st, 2d and 3d Battalions, 327th, then under the 1st Brigade, 101st Airborne Division (Air Assault) at Fort Campbell, KY.

Cold War
The 1st Battalion, 60th Infantry was assigned to the 172d Infantry Brigade at Fort Richardson, Alaska.
The 2d Battalion, 60th Infantry was reactivated on 21 October 1972 at Fort Lewis where it became the first motorized unit in the Army. It was used as an advanced training unit in highly maneuverable tactics using newly outfitted Humvees with TOW missile systems, Mk-19s and M2s.

The 3d Battalion, 60th Infantry was located at Fort Lewis from 1972 to 1988 and was primarily a "straight leg" (regular) infantry unit trained in airmobile operations until the unit with equipped TOW missile systems mounted on Humvees in the latter part of 1986. From November 1985 to June 1986 the 3-60th was deployed to the Sinai in Egypt, replacing the 101st Airborne Division (Air Assault) as the first regular infantry unit deployed for Multinational Force and Observers (MFO) service (attached to the 82d Airborne Division).

Desert Shield/Storm
The unit was mobilized to NTC at Fort Irwin, CA, in preparation for deployment to the Middle East during Desert Shield and was used to train National Guard units at the start of Desert Storm. It was then inactivated at Fort Lewis and relieved from assignment to the 9th Infantry Division in February 1991. During the drawdown of the 9th Infantry Division at Fort Lewis in 1991–1992, a residual brigade, based around the division's 3d Brigade, was briefly active as the 199th Infantry Brigade (Separate)(Motorized). The brigade's 2-60th Infantry was reorganized and reflagged as 1-33d Armor; later the entire brigade was reorganized and reflagged as the 2d Armored Cavalry Regiment.

Currently
The 60th Infantry Regiment was assigned to the Training and Doctrine Command on 27 August 1996, with the 2d Battalion activated at Fort Jackson, South Carolina.

The 2d Battalion "Scouts Out" and 3d Battalion, 60th Infantry Regiment "River Raiders" are currently assigned to the 193d Infantry Brigade at Fort Jackson, South Carolina, along with the 1st, 2d, and 3d Battalions, 13th Infantry Regiment. The battalions are organized for basic combat training with Companies A through F in each battalion.

Lineage
Constituted 15 May 1917 in the Regular Army as the 60th Infantry
Organized 10 June 1917 at Gettysburg National Park, Pennsylvania
Assigned 17 November 1917 to the 5th Division
Inactivated 2 September 1921 at Fort Jackson, South Carolina
Relieved 15 August 1927 from assignment to the 5th Division and assigned to the 8th Division.
Relieved 1 October 1933 from assignment to the 8th Division and assigned to the 5th Division
Relieved 16 October 1939 from assignment to the 5th Division
Assigned 1 August 1940 to the 9th Division (later redesignated as the 9th Infantry Division)
Activated 10 August 1940 at Fort Bragg, North Carolina
Moved to Chester, South Carolina, for maneuvers, and returned to Fort Bragg.
Transferred to Norfolk, Virginia, on 18 September 1942 for Amphibious Training.
Departed Hampton Roads Port of Embarkation on 27 October 1942 for North Africa.
Assaulted North Africa on 8 November 1942.
Landed in Sicily on 31 July 1943.
Arrived in England on 25 November 1943.
Landed in France on 11 June 1944.
Crossed into Belgium on 2 September 1944.
Entered Germany on 15 September 1944.
Attached to 104th Infantry Division from 18 December 1944 to 21 December 1944.
Attached to 2nd Armored Division from 22 December 1944 to 23 December 1944.
Attached to 9th Armored Division from 4 March 1945 to 5 March 1945.
Attached to 7th Armored Division from 8 March 1945 to 9 March 1945.
Attached to 3rd Armored Division from 22 April 1944 to 24 April 1945.
On Occupation Duty at Geisenfeld, Germany on VJ Day
Inactivated 30 November – 28 December 1946 in Germany
Activated 15 July 1947 at Fort Dix, New Jersey
Relieved 1 December 1957 from assignment to the 9th Infantry Division and reorganized as a parent regiment under the Combat Arms Regimental System
Activated December 1966 and assigned to the 9th Infantry Division for deployment to Vietnam
Withdrawn 1970 from Vietnam and inactivated
Activated 1976 9th Infantry Division, 2nd Brigade (Triple Threat), Fort Lewis, Washington
Withdrawn 16 June 1986 from the Combat Arms Regimental System and reorganized under the United States Army Regimental System
Transferred 15 April 1996 to the United States Army Training and Doctrine Command
Present Day: Assigned to 193rd Infantry Brigade, Ft Jackson, South Carolina

Medal of Honor recipients
Nine soldiers of the 60th Infantry were awarded the Medal of Honor:

World War I
 Captain Edward Allworth
 First Lieutenant Samuel Woodfill

World War II
 Second Lieutenant John E. Butts, Company E, 2nd Battalion
 Sergeant William L. Nelson, 2nd Battalion
 Captain Matt Urban, 2nd Battalion

Vietnam War
 Sergeant Leonard B. Keller, Company A, 3rd Battalion
 Private First Class Thomas James Kinsman, Company B, 3rd Battalion
 Private First Class Clarence Sasser, Headquarters Company, 3rd Battalion
 Specialist Four Raymond R. Wright, Company A, 3rd Battalion

Campaign participation credit
 World War I (4)
 St. Mihiel
 Meuse-Argonne
 Alsace 1918
 Lorraine 1918
 World War II (8)
 Algeria-French Morocco (Arrowhead device)
 Tunisia
 Sicily
 Normandy
 Northern France
 Rhineland
 Ardennes-Alsace
 Central Europe
 Vietnam (11)
 Counteroffensive, Phase II
 Counteroffensive, Phase III
 Tet Counteroffensive
 Counteroffensive, Phase IV
 Counteroffensive, Phase V
 Counteroffensive, Phase VI
 Tet 69/Counteroffensive
 Summer-Fall 1969
 Winter-Spring 1970
 Sanctuary Counteroffensive
 Counteroffensive, Phase VII

Unit awards
 US unit decorations
Presidential Unit Citation (Army), 2nd Battalion, 23–24 April 1943, for SEDJENANE VALLEY
Presidential Unit Citation (Army), 2nd Battalion, June 1943, for STE. COLOMBE
Presidential Unit Citation (Army), 3rd Battalion, 1944, for SCHWAMMANAUEL DAMS
Presidential Unit Citation (Army) for MEKONG DELTA
Presidential Unit Citation (Army) for DINH TUONG PROVINCE
Valorous Unit Award for SAIGON
Valorous Unit Award for FISH HOOK
 Foreign unit decorations
French Croix de Guerre with Palm for COTENTIN PENINSULA, WW II
Belgian Fourragere 1940, 2nd Battalion, for being cited twice, WW II
Belgian Croix de guere with Palm; cited in the Order of the Day of the Belgian Army for action at the Meuse River
Cited in the Order of the Day of the Belgian Army for action in the Ardennes

References

External links
2–60th Infantry Regiment Home Page
3/60th Infantry Regiment Home Page
60th Infantry Regiment Historic Preservation
60th Infantry Regiment in World War II

060
060
United States Army regiments of World War I